Dayana Martinez is a Venezuelan épée fencer. She has competed in three FIE world championships: 2010 Paris, France, 2013 Budapest, Hungary, and 2014 Kazan, Russia. She earned her first individual world gold medal in 2014, in women's épée, at the satellite tournament held in Kocaeli, Turkey.

Family of Fencers
Fencing is a family sport for Dayana, she competes alongside her sister, two-time olympian Maria Martinez and cousins, 2012 Men's Épée Olympic Champion Ruben Limardo and his younger brother, 2008 olympian Francisco Limardo.

Education
Dayana attended university in the United States, graduating with a bachelor of arts in Latin American Studies from Brigham Young University in 2013.

References

Living people
1986 births
Fencers at the 2015 Pan American Games
Venezuelan female épée fencers
Pan American Games silver medalists for Venezuela
Pan American Games medalists in fencing
Central American and Caribbean Games gold medalists for Venezuela
Central American and Caribbean Games silver medalists for Venezuela
Competitors at the 2010 Central American and Caribbean Games
Competitors at the 2014 Central American and Caribbean Games
South American Games silver medalists for Venezuela
South American Games bronze medalists for Venezuela
South American Games medalists in fencing
Competitors at the 2010 South American Games
Competitors at the 2014 South American Games
Central American and Caribbean Games medalists in fencing
Medalists at the 2015 Pan American Games
Venezuelan female foil fencers
People from Ciudad Bolívar
20th-century Venezuelan women
21st-century Venezuelan women